Khanpur is a city and capital of Khanpur Tehsil of the Rahim Yar Khan District, Bahawalpur Division, in the Punjab province of Pakistan. It is the 45th-largest city of Pakistan by population, according to the 2017 census.

Demography
According to the census of 2017, the city population was 203,597 with an annual growth rate of 2.6%. As of 2009, the recorded population of Khanpur was 156,152. And, according to 2017 Census Report, the total population of Khanpur Tehsil is 983,415.

Climate
Khanpur has a hot desert climate (Köppen climate classification BWh) with hot summers and mild winters. Rainfall is low, but some rain does fall in the monsoon season from July to September.

See also 
 Sipra
 Gujjar
 Punjabi people
 Liaquat Pur
 Firoza
 Rahim yar Khan
 Bahawalpur
 Bahawalpur (princely state)
 Rajput

References 

Populated places in Rahim Yar Khan District
Tehsils of Punjab, Pakistan
Rahim Yar Khan District